This is a list of all United States Supreme Court cases from volume 528 of the United States Reports:

External links

1999 in United States case law
2000 in United States case law